The 1973–74 season was the 75th season for FC Barcelona.

Squad

Transfers

Winter

Competitions

Friendlies

Joan Gamper Trophy

Primera Division

League table

Position by round

Matches

UEFA Cup

First round

Copa Generalisimo

Eightfinals

Quarterfinals

Semifinals

Final

Statistics

Players statistics

External links

webdelcule.com

FC Barcelona seasons
1973–74
Barcelona